Keratodermia punctata may refer to:
 Keratosis punctata palmaris et plantaris
 Keratosis punctata of the palmar creases

Palmoplantar keratodermas
Papulosquamous hyperkeratotic cutaneous conditions